is a Japanese singer-songwriter.

History  
Miwa was born in Shiunji, Niigata (currently Shibata) and graduated from Niigata Woman's College.

She was influenced by listening to Yumi Matsutoya during elementary school.

In 2000, her original song "Thanks to be here" won the grand prize at the Mos Burger-sponsored Christmas Song Grand Prix. After that, her indie music career began.

On September 18, 2003 her major label debut single "Warai" was released by avex trax.

Her single  ranked on the Oricon charts  available only in Niigata Prefecture.

Her contract with Avex Group expired at the end of July 2007.  She continued on as in independent artist after that but in 2012 a new official website appeared on the Avex portal and it was announced she had re-signed with Avex after a 5-year hiatus and that new releases were forthcoming.

Discography

Major Label Releases

Singles 
 1st Single:  (September 18, 2003)
 Limited to production only during 2003 – Highest Oricon Ranking: 49
  – Kirin Beverage Company's 'Koiwai Pure Fruit Juice' TV commercial song
 
 2nd Single: (October 16, 2003)
 Limited to production only during 2003 – Highest Oricon Ranking: 82
  – TBS's  TV show theme song
  – Mos Burger TV commercial song
 Re-released Single:  (May 26, 2004)
 Highest Oricon Ranking: 37
  – TBS's  TV show theme song
  – Kirin Beverage Company's 'Koiwai Pure Fruit Juice' TV commercial song
  – Mos Burger TV commercial song
 3rd Single:  (August 25, 2004)
 Highest Oricon Ranking: 99
  – TBS's  ending theme
 
 4th Single:  (November 17, 2004)
 Highest Oricon Ranking: 100
  – MBS and TBS's  ending theme
 
  (Solo Performance Version)
 5th Single:  (October 5, 2005)
 Highest Oricon Ranking: 144
  – NHK's Cancer Support Campaign song
 
 6th Single: Nigata Limited Edition  (October 26, 2005)
 Limited to 2000 copies available only in Nigata – Highest Oricon Ranking: 191
 
 7th Single:  (January 11, 2006)
 Highest Oricon Ranking: 162
 
 
 8th Single:  (August 30, 2006)
 
 
 
 9th Single:  (November 8, 2006)
  – TV Asahi's 'Selection X' ending theme

Albums 
 1st Album:  (November 19, 2003)
 Major Debut Album – Highest Oricon Ranking: 30
 
 
 
 
 
 
 
 
 
 
 
 
 2nd Album:  (January 19, 2005)
Highest Oricon Ranking: 21

 3rd Album:  (February 22, 2006)
 Highest Oricon Ranking: 82
 
 
  –  Shōchū TV commercial song (aired in the Touhoku region)
 
 
 
 
 
 
 
 
 
 4th Album: (March 7, 2007)
 
 
 
 
 
 
 
 
 
 
 
 
 Mini Album:  (August 29, 2012 – Originally planned for release on June 27)
 
 
 
 
 
 
 Mini Album:  (January 16, 2013)
 
 
  
 
 
 
 7th Album:  (January 15, 2014)

Indie Releases 
 Single X'mos with Smile Two Song Collection (December 1, 2000 – Out of Print)
 Miwa Sasagawa – "Thanks to be here"
 THE – 
 1st Single:  (April 5, 2001 – Out of Print)
 Mini Album:  (October 6, 2001 – Out of Print)
 2nd Single:  (June 29, 2002 – Out of Print)
 3rd Single:  (April 6, 2003 – Out of Print)
 DVD included
 Mini Album: miwa BLUE (June 6, 2008)
Available only at live events and on the APRILRECORDS online store.
 Mini Album: miwa NOEL (November 27, 2008 – Sold Out)
 1000 copy limited press (APRILRECORDS)
 5th Album: miwa MIRAGE (May 8, 2009)
 Included two bonus tracks
 Mini Album: miwaTALE (June 23, 2010)
 Concept CD. The limited quantity miwaTALE limited pre-order edition came in a string tie envelope with special letterpress lyric cards.
 6th Album: miwaGLITTER (November 17, 2010)

Filmography 
 Indie Music Video Collection VHS Tape: HIMAWARI (November 2002)
 Sold at live shows and on her Official Site (limited to 200 copies)

Public Performances

Radio 
  (October 2004 – March 25, 2005; March 3, 2006; August 25, 2012) Saturdays, 1:00 am – 3:00 am on Nippon Broadcasting System

Theater 
 +GOLD FISH (February 7–26, 2013, Tokyo Metropolitan Theatre)

Other 
 Her father operated his own civil engineering and construction company called Sasagawa Group Co., Ltd. So, Miwa was in fact the daughter of a company president. Incidentally, the company produced an original Japanese hand towel in collaboration with the release of the song, .
 , which could be called her seminal hit, was written for her cousin.
 She was pen pals with Masayuki Kishima, the mayor of Shiunji, since before her major label debut.
 She was the host of All Night Nippon when the 2004 Chūetsu earthquake occurred. Since Miwa herself lives in Niigata, she received a lot of e-mails and postcards of encouragement from listeners. She was quite moved and, in spite of herself, actually cried during the show. Fortunately, the earthquake was relatively weak in her home area of Shiunji and it received almost no damage. However, she did say during the show that she was forced to travel by air due to the Joetsu Shinkansen being impassable.
 She made a guest appearance at INORAN's Tour Final 2007 (Part One) on October 6, 2007 at Nakano Sun Plaza. She sang 3 songs from INORAN's first album  and her own song , which was produced by INORAN and H.Hayama, as well as two unreleased songs.
 On December 29, 2008 she appeared at INORAN's Connectivity live show at Shibuya's duo MUSIC EXCHANGE live venue.
 As the lone host of All Night Nippon, she would often suddenly begin speaking in an angry sounding tone as if she had lost her temper. Even her tagline in the show's commercial was her angrily saying, "Do I sound mad?!"
 She appeared again as the host of All Night Nippon on August 25, 2012, about 6 years and 5 months since her last appearance. During the show she talked about her father's company no longer existing and said that she was no longer the daughter of a company president.

Footnotes

External links 
 Official Site
 Official Blog
 Official Facebook
 Official Twitter
 Former Blog

Japanese women singer-songwriters
Avex Group artists
Musicians from Niigata Prefecture
1983 births
Living people
20th-century Japanese women singers
20th-century Japanese singers
21st-century Japanese women singers
21st-century Japanese singers